Ruthenium(III) bromide is a chemical compound of ruthenium and bromine with the formula RuBr3. It is a dark brown solid that decomposes above 400 °C.

Preparation 
Ruthenium(III) bromide can be prepared by the reaction of ruthenium metal with bromine at high temperature and pressure (720 K and 20 bar):

2 Ru + 3 Br2 → 2 RuBr3

Structure 
The crystal structures of ruthenium(III) bromide contain parallel (RuBr3)∞ columns. The compound undergoes a phase transition around 384 K (111 °C) from an ordered orthorhombic structure in space group Pnmm with alternating long and short Ru-Ru distances to a disordered hexagonal TiI3-like structure in space group P63/mcm with (on average) equal Ru-Ru distances. In the disordered polymorph, the Ru-Ru distances are not believed to actually be equal but appear so due to a random distribution of two distinct column conformations. Both polymorphs consist of hexagonally close-packed bromide ions.

References

Ruthenium(III) compounds
Bromides
Platinum group halides